St. Mary's Convent is located in St. Nazianz, Wisconsin. It was built by Ambrose Oschwald, the Roman Catholic priest who founded St. Nazianz. The site was added to the National Register of Historic Places in 2001.

References

Churches on the National Register of Historic Places in Wisconsin
Convents in the United States
Buildings and structures in Manitowoc County, Wisconsin
Religious buildings and structures completed in 1865
National Register of Historic Places in Manitowoc County, Wisconsin